Sheng Tongsheng or Tung-sheng Sheng was a Chinese veterinary physician and microbiologist. Sheng was also made contribution to veterinary education, he was the first president of the first independent college of veterinary medicine in China, he is considered one of founders of modern Chinese veterinary medicine.

Early life and education 
Sheng was born at Changsha in 1911, while his ancestors came from Yongxiu, Jiangxi. He attended Yali High School at age 11. The Northern Expedition extended Changsha in 1926, thereafter he transferred to Kiangsi Provincial No.2 High School.

Sheng was enrolled at then National Central University in 1928, he entered Shanghai Medical College as a biology undergraduate in 1934. Later he won the full scholarship to study in German, after the first year at University of Munich, he transferred to University of Berlin, he obtained Dr. Med. in 1936 there. Then he received doctorate in veterinary medicine in 1938.

Career 
Sheng backed to China in 1938, at first he was a professor at Kiangsi Provincial Veterinary Academy, then he went to National Northwest Associated University and worked there during 1939–41. He arrived in Chengdu, and taught at Animal Husbandry and Veterinary Medicine Department, National Central University until 1946. Meantime, Sheng overcame the rigours of research during the war, finished the paper "Virus Encephalomyelitis in Buffaloes" (Science 15 Mar 1946, Vol.103(2672), pp. 344–346).

References 

1911 births
1987 deaths
Biologists from Hunan
Chinese microbiologists
Chinese veterinarians
Educators from Hunan
Members of the Chinese Academy of Sciences
Nanjing University alumni
People from Changsha